Tell Zenoub   is a local authority  in the Western Beqaa District in Lebanon

History
Although later occupation was detected, numerous Heavy Neolithic flints were found in fields south of the tell.

In 1838, Eli Smith noted Tell Zenoub as being a village in the Beqaa Valley.

References

Bibliography

External links
Tall Znoub, Localiban

Populated places in Western Beqaa District
Heavy Neolithic sites
Neolithic settlements
Archaeological sites in Lebanon